The 2014 women's road cycling season was the first for the Parkhotel Valkenburg Continental Team as an UCI women's team. It was the second year for the team which began as Parkhotel Valkenburg p/y Math Salden in 2013.

Roster

As of 1 January 2014. Ages as of 1 January 2014.

Riders who stayed from the 2013 non-UCI team are (all Dutch): Aafke Eshuis, Sophie de Boer, Bianca van den Hoek,  Ilona Hoeksma, Riejanne Markus, Jermaine Post, Rozanne Slik, Lisanne Soemanta.

In

Results in major races

Single day races

Grand Tours

UCI World Ranking

The 2014 UCI Women's Road Rankings are rankings based upon the results in all UCI-sanctioned races of the 2014 women's road cycling season.

Parkhotel Valkenburg Continental Team finished 24th in the 2014 ranking for UCI teams.

References

2014 UCI Women's Teams seasons
2014 in Dutch sport
2014